The Design Revolution: Answering the Toughest Questions about Intelligent Design is a 2004 book by William A. Dembski, who supports intelligent design, and the idea that certain features of the universe and of living things are best explained by an intelligent cause, not a naturalistic process such as natural selection. The book is written in question/answer format from Dembski's point of view as one of the conceptual leaders in the movement. Each chapter is about 4 pages long and addresses one specific question. Dembski describes these questions as from his prior ten years experience in lectures, media interviews, and published criticism by the scientific community opposed to intelligent design, who constitute the majority of the scientific community and science education organizations. The foreword was written by Charles W. Colson.

In the preface Dembski states he is progressively more convinced that Intelligent Design will revolutionize science, and that revolutionaries must be willing to take abuse and ridicule by the ruling elite, in this case the "dogmatic Darwinists and scientific naturalists."

Criticism
Mathematician Jeffrey Shallit criticises the book for evasion and dissembling.  Mark Perakh mentions this book in his criticisms of Dembski, criticizing that the index does not contain the names of prominent critics.

References

External links
Publisher's info page on the book
Book info from ARN (Access Research Network)
Jeffrey Shallit article, Desperately Evading the Toughest Questions
Mark Perakh article, The design revolution? How William Dembski Is Dodging Questions About Intelligent Design

2004 non-fiction books
Books by William A. Dembski
English-language books
Intelligent design books
Intelligent design movement